The 1976 All-Ireland Senior Ladies' Football Championship Final was the third All-Ireland Final and the deciding match of the 1976 All-Ireland Senior Ladies' Football Championship, an inter-county ladies' Gaelic football tournament for the top teams in Ireland.

Offaly dominated the early stages but Noreen Thompson at right corner back defended well and Kerry ran out ten-point winners, Mary Geaney scoring 3–2.

References

Ladies}
All-Ireland Senior Ladies' Football Championship Finals
Kerry county ladies' football team matches
Offaly county ladies' football team matches
All-Ireland